Jacob Eli Sjønhard Olsen (born 2 October 1972) is a Faroese former footballer who played as a defender and made two appearances for the Faroe Islands national team.

Career
Olsen made his international debut for the Faroe Islands on 5 August 1992 in a friendly match against Israel, which finished as a 1–1 draw in Toftir. He earned his second and final cap on 27 July 1997 in a friendly against Iceland, which finished as a 0–1 loss in Höfn.

Career statistics

International

References

External links
 
 
 

1972 births
Living people
People from Tórshavn
Faroese footballers
Faroe Islands under-21 international footballers
Faroe Islands international footballers
Association football defenders
B68 Toftir players
Havnar Bóltfelag players
LÍF Leirvík players
07 Vestur players
Faroe Islands Premier League players
1. deild players
2. deild players
Faroese football managers